The 12109 / 12110 Panchavati Express is a superfast train that connects Mumbai with Manmad. It is a daily means of transport for passengers traveling between Mumbai, capital of Maharashtra and Nashik. It is lifeline of passengers from manmad and nashik.Every year Passengers are celebrate its birthday.train is recorded in the Limca book of records as an ideal train since the train preserves some of its features. It is one of the prestigious trains of Central Railways. It was introduced on 1 November 1975.

Schedule 
12110 UP Panchavati Express departs Manmad Junction at 06:02 IST and reaches Chhatrapati Shivaji Terminus (CST), Mumbai at 10:45 IST. 12109 DOWN Panchvati Express departs Chhatrapati Shivaji Terminus, Mumbai daily at 18:15 IST and reaches Manmad Junction at 22:50 IST The train covers a distance of 258 km between Manmad Junction and Chhatrapati Shivaji Terminus.

Stoppage
After leaving Manmad Junction, the train have official halts at Lasalgaon, Deolali,  and  before reaching Mumbai CSMT.

Rake/Coach composition

Coach position

 12109 : MUMBAI CST->MANMAD
 Engine-EOG-GEN1-GEN2-GEN3-GEN4-GEN5-GEN6-GEN7-GEN8-MST1-MST2-D5-D4-D3-D2-D1-C1-C2-C3(AC MST)-LDS-EOG.; Total Coaches-21

 12110 : MANMAD->MUMBAI CST
 Engine-EOG-LDS-C3(AC MST)-C2-C1-D1-D2-D3-D4-D5-MST2-MST1-GEN1-GEN2-GEN3-GEN4-GEN5-GEN6-GEN7-GEN8-EOG.; Total Coaches-21

Traction
Central Railway switching over completely to AC traction, it is now hauled from end to end by an Ajni / Kalyan-based WAP-7 locomotive.

Gallery

See also
 Godavari Superfast Express
 Hazur Sahib Nanded–Mumbai CST Rajya Rani Express

References

External links
'Adarsh Coach' in Limca Book of Records - News - Webindia123.com
Shameful act! Indian Railways’ Panchavati Express vandalised by passengers within months of upgradation
12110/Panchavati Express - Manmad to Chhatrapati Shivaji Maharaj Terminus CR/Central Zone - Railway Enquiry

Transport in Mumbai
Transport in Manmad
Railway services introduced in 1973
Express trains in India
Rail transport in Maharashtra
Named passenger trains of India